Sheri Jesiel (born April 15, 1958) was a Republican member of the Illinois House of Representatives. She represented the 61st district from her appointment in July 2014 to replace the outgoing State Representative JoAnn D. Osmond until her loss to Joyce Mason in the 2018 general election. The 61st district is based in Northern Lake County and includes Zion, Winthrop Harbor, Beach Park, Old Mill Creek, Gurnee and Antioch.

Representative Jesiel served on the Appropriations-Elementary & Secondary Education, Appropriations-Human Services, Business Growth & Incentives, Human Services, Mass Transit and Personnel & Pensions Committees.

In the 2014 election, she defeated Loren Karner with 58% of the vote to Karner's 42%. In the 2016 race, she topped challenger Nick Ciko 57% to 43%. She lost the 2018 general election to Joyce Mason.

References

External links
Illinois General Assembly Site

Living people
1958 births
People from Lake County, Illinois
Carthage College alumni
Republican Party members of the Illinois House of Representatives
Women state legislators in Illinois
21st-century American politicians
21st-century American women politicians